Zoran Žigić (Зоран Жигић) (born September 20, 1958 in Balte, Čelinac, SR Bosnia and Herzegovina, Yugoslavia) is a Bosnian Serb who was charged with violation of the customs of war and crimes against humanity by the International Criminal Tribunal for the Former Yugoslavia (ICTY) for his actions in the Prijedor region including crimes at the Omarska, Trnopolje and Keraterm camps during the Bosnian War.

Žigić surrendered to the court in 1998 where he faced multiple counts of crimes against humanity and violations of the customs of war, to all of which he pleaded not guilty. His trial was held together with the trials of Miroslav Kvočka, Mladen Radić, Dragoljub Prcac, Milojica Kos, and Mladjo Radić. He was sentenced to twenty-five years' imprisonment. In June 2006 he was transferred to an Austrian jail to serve the rest of his sentence. He was granted early release on 16 December 2014.

References

External links
 ICTY Amended Indictment
 ICTY Judgment

1958 births
Living people
People convicted by the International Criminal Tribunal for the former Yugoslavia
People indicted by the International Criminal Tribunal for the former Yugoslavia
Serbs of Bosnia and Herzegovina convicted of war crimes
Bosnia and Herzegovina people imprisoned abroad
Prisoners and detainees of Austria
Serbs of Bosnia and Herzegovina convicted of crimes against humanity